Argle or Argles may refer to:

Argle
 A surname, variant of Orgill
 A fictional character in works of Margot Pardoe

Argles
 Argles, surname

See also
 Argleton
 Argyle (disambiguation)
Argile (disambiguation)
Argyll (disambiguation)